Zhou Yu (175–210), Han dynasty general who served the warlords Sun Ce and his successor Sun Quan

Zhou Yu is also the name of:
Zhou Yu (Renming) ( 2nd century), Han dynasty official who served the warlords Cao Cao and Yuan Shao
Zhou Yu (canoeist) (born 1989), Chinese sprint canoeist
Zhou Yu (table tennis) (born 1992), Chinese table tennis player
 Chou Tzu-yu (born 1999, Zhou Zi-yu in Pinyin), Taiwanese singer and member of Korean girl group TWICE